Camila Giorgi was the defending champion, having won the event in 2012, but chose not to defend her title.

Ajla Tomljanović won the title, defeating Zhang Shuai in the final, 2–6, 6–4, 6–3.

Seeds

Main draw

Finals

Top half

Bottom half

References 
 Main draw

Dothan Pro Tennis Classic - Singles
Hardee's Pro Classic